Neige Dias was the defending champion but lost in the quarterfinals to Andrea Vieira.

Mercedes Paz won in the final 7–5, 6–2 against Rene Simpson.

Seeds
A champion seed is indicated in bold text while text in italics indicates the round in which that seed was eliminated.

  Bettina Fulco (quarterfinals)
  Neige Dias (quarterfinals)
  Mercedes Paz (champion)
  Adriana Villagrán (first round)
  Céline Cohen (first round)
  Patricia Medrado (second round)
  Veronika Martinek (first round)
  Gisele Miró (quarterfinals)

Draw

References
 1988 Rainha Cup Draw

Women's Singles
Singles
1988 in Brazilian tennis